Aporrhaidae is a family of sea snails commonly called the "pelican's foot snails."  The taxonomy of the Gastropoda by Bouchet & Rocroi, 2005 categorizes Aporrhaidae as marine gastropod mollusks in the clade Littorinimorpha.

Aporrhaids are commercially important, especially in traditional fisheries.

Description
Aporrhaids have a large lip with finger-like extensions, and a small operculum. They do not have movable eyes. Instead, their eyes are fixed at the base of each tentacle.

The mollusk has one narrow foot, which renders its motion interrupted as the foot must raise the shell a tiny bit in each single movement, simultaneously pushing it forward. The motion must be repeated again and again for the mollusk to travel.

Habitat
Aporrhaidae live on muddy and sandy bottoms, sometimes in very large populations.

Subfamilies 
Subfamilies in the family Aporrhaidae include:
 Aporrhainae Gray, 1850 - synonym: Chenopidae Deshayes, 1865
 Arrhoginae Popenoe, 1983 - synonyms: Alariidae Koken, 1889 (inv.); Dicrolomatidae Korotkov, 1992
 † Harpagonidae Pchelintsev, 1963
 † Perissopterinae Korotkov, 1992 - synonym: Struthiopterinae Zinsmeister & Griffin, 1995
 † Spinigerinae Korotkov, 1992 (inv.)

Genera
There are only two Recent genera:
 Aporrhais da Costa, 1778
 Arrhoges Gabb, 1868
 † Dicroloma Gabb, 1868
 † Drepanocheilus Meek, 1864
 † Hemichenopus Steinmann & Wilckens, 1908
 † Struthioptera Finlay & Marwick, 1937

Fossil genera within the family Aporrhaidae include:
 Alarimella Saul, 1998
 Anchura Conrad, 1860
 Antarctohoges Stilwell & Zinsmeister, 1992
 Araeodactylus Harris & Burrows, 1891
 Auriala Hacobjan, 1976
 Austroaporrhais Zinsmeister & Griffin, 1995
 Bicorempterus Gründel, 2001
 Ceratosiphon Gill, 1870
 Cultrigera Böhm, 1885
 Cuphosolenus Piette, 1876
 Cuphotifer Piette, 1876
 Cyclomolops Gabb, 1868
 Diarthema Piette, 1864
 Digitolabrum Cossmann, 1904
 Dimorphosoma Gardner, 1875
 Graciliala Sohl, 1960
 Goniocheila Gabb, 1868
 Helicaulax Gabb, 1868
 Kangilioptera Rosenkrantz, 1970
 Kaunhowenia Abdel Gawad, 1986
 Latiala Sohl, 1960
 Lispodesthes White, 1875
 Maussenetia Cossmann, 1904
 Mexopus Kiel & Perrilliat, 2001
 Monocuphus Piette, 1876
 Perissopter Tate, 1865
 Peruchilus Olsson, 1931
 Pietteia Cossmann, 1904
 Platyoptera Conrad, 1855
 Pseudanchura Kollmann, 2005
 Pterocerella Meek, 1864
 Pugioptera Pchelincev, 1953
 Strombopugnellus Koch, 1911
 Struthiochenopus Zinsmeister & Griffin, 1995
 Teneposita Loch, 1989
 Tessarolax Gabb, 1864
 Tibiaporrhais Elder, 1990
 Toarctocera Gründel, Nützel & Schulbert, 2009 - type species: Rostellaria subpunctata - Toarctocera subpunctata (von Munster in Goldfuss, 1826–1844)
 Trilemma  Blagovetshenskiy & Shumilkin, 2006
 Tulochilus Finlay & Marwick, 1937
 Tundora Stephenson, 1941
 Ueckeritzella Gründel, 1998
 Wateletia Cossmann, 1889

References

 Vaught, K.C. (1989). A classification of the living Mollusca. American Malacologists: Melbourne, FL (USA). . XII, 195 pp.

External links
 
 
 Gastropoda Stromboidea - Ulrich Wieneke and Han Stoutjesdijk

 
Stromboidea
Taxa named by John Edward Gray